Purple Pilgrims is a New Zealand dream pop duo composed of sisters Clementine and Valentine Nixon.

Background 
Sisters Clementine and Valentine Nixon are great-granddaughters of folk musician Davie Stewart. They were raised itinerantly between Christchurch, New Zealand and Hong Kong, China.

Musical style 
Purple Pilgrims' music combines elements of dream pop, noise, lo-fi, folk, and atmospheric jazz.
The duo has been frequently likened to Kate Bush, Beach House and 1980s dream pop artists. Stuff has referred to the band as "Aotearoa's answer to haze-pop pioneers Dead Can Dance and Cocteau Twins".

The sisters' soprano vocal styles have been compared to Marianne Faithfull, Mary Hopkin, Joni Mitchell, Judy Collins, Sandy Denny, Vashti Bunyan and Linda Perhacs.

Purple Pilgrims utilize a mixture of digital and analog recording techniques in their work, from an early DIY approach using cassette tape collage to analog studio processing in their later work.

Career 
Purple Pilgrims released their first recording a self-titled 8" lathe cut record in 2011 via New Zealand underground label Pseudo Arcana. The limited edition release came with a 12 page art zine. The New Zealand Listener called the work "assertively lo-as-fi-can-go ... a good example of gently and deeply moving elegant dream pop."

In 2013 the band released a split LP with American avant-garde musician and frequent Purple Pilgrims collaborator Gary War via London-based label Upset the Rhythm.

Purple Pilgrims released their debut LP Eternal Delight in 2016 via Los Angeles based label Not Not Fun Records. The Guardian said that the album "could’ve come direct from golden era 4AD Records when the Cocteau Twins still roamed."[30].

Purple Pilgrims' sophomore album Perfumed Earth was released on August 9, 2019 via Flying Nun Records. The Sydney Morning Herald called the album "an alluring combination of hazy soundscape and songwriting finesse…" while Pitchfork noted “...its lush melodies, strands that wind and splay like a carpet of vine”.

Purple Pilgrims have toured with Ariel Pink, Aldous Harding, John Maus, and Weyes Blood.

Discography

Albums 
 Eternal Delight (Not Not Fun Records 2016)
 Perfumed Earth (Flying Nun Records 2019)

Other Releases 
 Purple Pilgrims Self-titled (8" lathe cut, Pseudo Arcana 2011)
 "Drink the Juice" (online single, Not Not Fun Records 2017)

Collaborations 
 Gary War / Purple Pilgrims (Split LP, Upset the Rhythm 2013)
 Mirage by Roy Montgomery and Purple Pilgrims (Roy Montgomery 'Suffuse' LP, Grapefruit Records 2018)

References

New Zealand musical duos
New Zealand pop music groups
Sibling musical duos
Female musical duos